BBF may refer to:
 Back button focus, a photography technique
 Behavioral and Brain Functions, a scientific journal
 Belgian Badminton Federation
 Best bin first, a type of search algorithm
 Bobby Bowden Field, the football field at Florida State University in Tallahassee
 Boston By Foot, a non-profit tour organization
 British Baseball Federation
 Paris Hilton's British Best Friend, a reality television series
 Broadband Forum, a computer networking industry consortium